Constantine John Phipps, 2nd Baron Mulgrave  (30 May 1744 – 10 October 1792) was an English explorer and officer in the Royal Navy. He served during the Seven Years' War and the American War of Independence, seeing action in a number of battles and engagements. Inheriting a title, he also went on to have a successful career in Parliament and occupied a number of political offices during his later years.

Family and early life
Phipps was born on 30 May 1744, the eldest son of Constantine Phipps, 1st Baron Mulgrave and his wife, Lepel Hervey, the eldest daughter of John 2nd Baron Hervey of Ickworth and Mary 'Molly' Lepel. Phipps attended Eton College, where he befriended Joseph Banks, the English naturalist, botanist, and later patron of the natural sciences.

Seven Years' War
In January 1759, he joined the 70-gun  as a cadet under his uncle Captain Augustus Hervey during Hervey's 21-week watch on the French fleet in 1759. Phipps remained with his uncle on the latter's appointment to the 74-gun  in 1761, and was present at the British expedition against Martinique. His good service led to his promotion to lieutenant on 17 March 1762 by Sir George Rodney, and Phipps went on to serve in the siege of Havana.

He was further promoted on 24 November 1763 to command the 12-gun sloop , moving to the 24-gun sixth rate Terpsichore on 20 June 1765. In 1766, he sailed to Newfoundland as lieutenant on  under Captain Sir Thomas Adams. Joseph Banks accompanied him as ship's naturalist. From 1767 to 1768, Phipps commanded  in the English Channel.

Political career and command
Phipps was elected to Parliament in the 1768 general election as Member for the constituency of Lincoln. On 4 June 1773 Phipps set off from Deptford on a voyage towards the North Pole. Phipps took with him Dr Charles Irving as naturalist and doctor accompanied by Olaudah Equiano, and Israel Lyons (1739–1775) as astronomer. The Carcass was commanded by Skeffington Lutwidge, while one of her midshipmen was a young Horatio Nelson.

They sailed beyond Svalbard to the Seven Islands, but were forced back by the ice and returned to Orford Ness on 17 September. During the voyage Phipps was the first modern European to describe the polar bear and the ivory gull, which were included in his A Voyage towards the North Pole undertaken ... 1773 (1774).

On 13 September 1775, he succeeded his father as Baron Mulgrave in the Peerage of Ireland. He became MP for Huntingdon in 1777, and was also appointed as one of the Lords of the Admiralty. Continuing an active naval career, he commissioned the 74-gun  in 1778, and played a leading role in the Battle of Ushant on 27 July that year. Phipps led the attack on the 90-gun , but the indecisive nature of the engagement meant that the French ship was able to escape.

Phipps returned to Britain and gave evidence at the subsequent court-martial, his evidence favouring Hugh Palliser. The Courageux remained under his command until 1781, with Phipps serving mostly in the Channel under Admirals Charles Hardy, Francis Geary, George Darby and Richard Howe.

In the action of 4 January 1781, he captured the 32-gun French frigate Minerve in heavy weather off Brest. The Courageux was paid off at the end of the American War of Independence, and Phipps went ashore, never to serve at sea again.

Later life
Phipps remained as MP for Huntingdon until 1784, when he became MP for Newark. In April that year he became Paymaster of the Forces and on 18 May he was appointed a commissioner for the affairs of India, and one of the Lords of Trade and Plantations, until being forced to resign in 1791 due to ill health.

In 1790 he was made Baron Mulgrave of Mulgrave in the County of York in the Peerage of Great Britain, thus entering the House of Lords. He also was a Fellow of the Royal Society and of the Society of Antiquaries. He once entertained his miners underground in the Blue John Caverns in Castleton, Derbyshire. The particular cavern where they all dined as his guests is now named after him.

He died at Liège on 10 October 1792. The title of Baron Mulgrave in the British peerage then became extinct, though his brother Henry Phipps succeeded him in the Irish barony.

See also
Phippsøya, the largest island in the Sjuøyane group, is named after him

Notes

References 

 
 
 
 

1744 births
1792 deaths
Barons in the Peerage of Great Britain
Barons in the Peerage of Ireland
British MPs 1768–1774
British MPs 1774–1780
British MPs 1780–1784
British MPs 1784–1790
English explorers
English ornithologists
Fellows of the Royal Society
Lords of the Admiralty
Members of the Parliament of Great Britain for English constituencies
Members of the Privy Council of Great Britain
Peers of Great Britain created by George III
People educated at Eton College
Constantine
Politics of Lincoln, England
Royal Navy officers
People from Whitby